Kosmos 775 ( meaning Cosmos 775) is a Soviet US-KS missile early warning satellite which was launched in 1975 as part of the Oko programme. The satellite is designed to identify missile launches using optical telescopes and infrared sensors.

Kosmos 775 was launched from Site 81/23 at Baikonur Cosmodrome in the Kazakh SSR. A Proton-K carrier rocket with a DM upper stage was used to perform the launch, which took place at 00:30 UTC on 8 October 1975. The launch attempted to place the satellite into geostationary orbit. It subsequently received its Kosmos designation, and the international designator 1975-097A. The United States Space Command assigned it the Satellite Catalog Number 8357.

It was the first US-KS satellite and was never operational. Podvig says its orbit was never stabilised, NASA's National Space Science Data Centre says it exploded. The next launch of one of these craft was Kosmos 1546 in 1984.

See also

List of Kosmos satellites (751–1000)

References

Kosmos satellites
Oko
1975 in the Soviet Union
1975 in spaceflight
Spacecraft launched in 1975
Spacecraft launched by Proton rockets